Georgia Burke (February 27, 1878 — November 28, 1985) was an American actress who had performed on television, radio, and Broadway theatre between the 1930s and the 1960s. In 1934 Burke made her debut in Broadway in They Shall Not Die, and in 1944 she won a Donaldson Award as the third choice for Best Supporting Actress in Edward Chodorov's play, Decision. Burke had performed in the 1952 U.S. State Department-sponsored international production of Porgy and Bess and had taken a role as a nurse in the radio program When a Girl Marries, which had been broadcast for 18 years. She had also performed in the 1944 Broadway production of Anna Lucasta and its second film counterpart in 1958.

Burke has been credited as one of the early appearances of the "stereotyped humorous black maid" in entertainment since her appearance in the radio soap opera Betty and Bob.

She died in 1985 at the age of 107, at the De Witt Nursing Home in Manhattan.

Early life and career
Burke was born on February 27, 1878, in La Grange or Atlanta, Georgia, to a minister and a nurse. She attended Claflin University and New Orleans University and worked as a public school teacher in Wilson, North Carolina. Due to a slapping incident by superintendent Charles L. Coon towards another teacher, Burke, along with other colored teachers at the school, protested the incident by resigning from her teaching position and continued teaching at another school. Burke later moved to New York City, where she attended Columbia University in 1929.

During a visit to Lew Leslie's first rehearsal of Blackbirds of 1928, a friend of Burke's urged her to sing St. Louis Blues in front of the rehearsal cast, where Leslie had walked in and—among hearing her voice—persuaded her to join the pre-existing choir for Blackbirds of 1928. She was given a year's leave from teaching but never returned to her former teaching career.

Filmography

Television
 The Big Story 
 Hallmark Hall of Fame: The Little Foxes (1956) 
 ABC Theater - If You Give a Dance, You Gotta Pay the Band

Film
 Anna Lucasta

Theatre
 Blackbirds of 1928
 Decision - 1944
 The Grass Harp
 Porgy and Bess
 Five Star Final
 Savage Rhythm
 Anna Lucasta
 In Abraham's Bosom
 Old Man Satan
 They Shall Not Die
 Mamba's Daughters
 Cabin in the Sky
 No Time for Comedy
 Interlock
 The Sun Field
 Mandingo
 Tambourines to Glory
 The Wisteria Trees

Radio
 John Henry: Black River Giant
 When a Girl Marries
 New World A-Comin'

References

Further reading

External links

African-American actresses
American radio actresses
1878 births
1985 deaths
African-American centenarians
American centenarians
American stage actresses
20th-century American actresses
Actresses from Atlanta
People from LaGrange, Georgia
African-American schoolteachers
Schoolteachers from North Carolina
American women educators
Claflin University alumni
Columbia University alumni
Women centenarians
20th-century African-American women
20th-century African-American people
American television actresses